Howard Township is a township in Elk County, Kansas, USA.  As of the 2016 ACS, its population was 865.

Geography
According to the USGS, it contains one cemetery, Howard.

The streams of East Hitchen Creek, Game Creek, Little Hitchen Creek, Mound Branch, Pawpaw Creek, Rock Creek, Snake Creek and West Hitchen Creek run through this township.

References
 USGS Geographic Names Information System (GNIS)

External links
 City-Data.com

Townships in Elk County, Kansas
Townships in Kansas